Major General Gagan Deep Bakshi  or G. D. Bakshi (born 1950) is a retired Indian Army officer. He has promoted fake news and misinformation on a number of occasions.

Early life and education

Bakshi was born in Jabalpur, Madhya Pradesh. His father was S. P. Bakshi.

He was educated at St. Aloysius Senior Secondary School, Jabalpur and University of Madras. After his schooling, he went to the National Defence Academy at Khadakwasla, Pune.

Career
Bakshi was commissioned in the Indian Army from IMA Dehradun in November 1971. He commanded the 6 Jammu and Kashmir Rifles.

Bakshi was awarded the Vishisht Seva Medal for commanding a battalion in the Kargil War. Later, he was awarded the Sena Medal for distinguished service in commanding a battalion during counter-insurgency drives.

Bakshi subsequently commanded the Romeo Force (Part of Rashtriya Rifles) during intensive counter-insurgency operations in the Rajouri and Poonch districts of Jammu and Kashmir and succeeded in suppressing the armed militancy in this area.

Bakshi served two tenures at the Directorate General of Military Operations and was the first BGS (IW) at the Northern Command, where he dealt with Information Warfare and Psychological Operations. He retired in 2008.

Controversies

He is sometimes called on news channels for his views on politics and he often appears on Republic TV, where he frequently defends narrative of Arnab Goswami. His analysis is often criticized by other journalists for having a strong bias favouring the ruling government's agenda.

In one debate at Republic TV he was criticized for using profane language.

Retirement
In retirement, Bakshi has turned his energies to the pen and authored a handful of books, the most recent appearing in 2017. He is called on news channels of India to provide views on topics related to the military and defence. For example, he stars on the Republic TV series "The Grand Strategy".

Views on the 2022 Russian invasion of Ukraine
Bakshi devoted an entire episode of "The Grand Strategy" to the lessons derivable from observation of the 2022 Russian invasion of Ukraine, which turned in April from a Blitzkrieg war into an artillery duel. In this regard, Bakshi congratulates the work of Colonel Markus Reisner of the Österreichs Bundesheer. He is puzzled at the fact that Putin has only given 150,000 men to his army, while the Ukrainians can field 250,000 men. He laments the fact that the Indian defense budget has been reduced from 2.8% to a meagre 2.1%, and observes that, due to Covid-19 the Indian Army failed to recruit any men and therefore shrank 200,000 men from a pre-Covid mass of 1,300,000 men. He draws a parallel over the fact that the Russians face a shortage of manpower in the Ukraine, to which he ties their lacklustre performance, while demographically India is among the youngest countries in the world. He finds that reduction of manpower is a recipe for disaster, and that the Ukrainians are crying for artillery. At least 70% of Indian army equipment is of Russian design. Bakshi says that the Russians have kept their best formations in reserve (i.e. the T-14 tank) because they fear a conflict with NATO. UAVs, Javelins, Stingers and the S400 systems are all not his favourite. He sees Russian political micro-management of the army as a dead end. As well he touches on the breach of the Russian communication system, especially with regards to the disappearance of the Russian command structure.

Bibliography

Bakshi, G. D. (2016). Bose: The Indian Samurai - Netaji and the Ina a Military Assessment. .

Awards and decorations

References

1950 births
Living people
People from Jabalpur
Punjabi people
Indian Hindus
Indian generals
University of Madras alumni
Recipients of the Sena Medal
Recipients of the Vishisht Seva Medal
Indian Army officers
National Defence Academy (India) alumni
Academic staff of the National Defence College, India
National Defence College, India alumni